Guy Gunaratne (born 1984) is a British journalist, filmmaker and novelist. Gunaratne identifies as non-binary and uses he/they/them pronouns.

In 2019 their first novel, In Our Mad and Furious City, won the Dylan Thomas Prize, the Jhalak Prize and the Authors' Club Best First Novel Award. They are based between London and Malmö, Sweden.

Early life and education
Gunaratne was born and grew up in Neasden, north west London. Their father had immigrated from Sri Lanka in 1951. They studied for a film and television degree at Brunel University London in London, then studied current affairs journalism at City, University of London.

Career
With fellow student and girlfriend, Heidi Lindvall, they set up a film production company. They made a film about suppression of the media in Sri Lanka a week after the civil war ended, the success of which allowed them to work in television. Though based in London, the couple followed their work in post-conflict areas around the world, living in a number of places, including Berlin.

During this period of making work for television, Gunaratne wrote their first novel, In Our Mad and Furious City. Its story is set in and around a north west London council estate, in the 48 hours following a killing reminiscent of the 2013 murder of Lee Rigby. It is narrated by five main characters in turn, in first-person voices. In Our Mad and Furious City deals with "questions about Britain’s divided society and capturing the nuances of urban life".

As of 2019, they are based between London and Malmö, Sweden.

Publications
In Our Mad and Furious City. London: Tinder; Hachette, 2018. . New York: MCD x FSG Originals, 2018. .

Awards
2018: Shortlisted, Gordon Burn Prize
2018: Shortlisted, Goldsmiths Prize
2018: Longlisted, 2018 Man Booker Prize
2018: Longlisted, Orwell Prize for Political Fiction
2019: Winner, Dylan Thomas Prize, a £30,000 award
2019: Winner, Jhalak Prize
2019: Winner, Authors' Club Best First Novel Award

References

External links

British Asian writers
British people of Sri Lankan descent
British male writers
Living people
1984 births
Alumni of Brunel University London
Alumni of City, University of London